Alejandro Pablo Traversa Machado (born 8 September 1974), commonly known as Alejandro Traversa, is a Uruguayan footballer whose position is a defender.

Teams
  Defensor Sporting 1993–2002
  Poli Ejido 2002–2003
  Badajoz 2003–2006
  Badalona 2006–2007
  Premià 2007–2008
  Defensor Sporting 2008–2010
  El Tanque Sisley 2010–2012

International career

Under-17
Traversa has played for the Uruguay under-17 team at the 1991 FIFA U-17 World Championship in Italy.

Under-20
He also played with the Uruguay national under-20 football team at the 1993 FIFA World Youth Championship in Australia.

References

External links
 
 
 Alejandro Traversa at playmakerstats.com (English version of ceroacero.es)

1974 births
Living people
Footballers from Montevideo
Uruguayan footballers
Uruguay youth international footballers
Uruguay under-20 international footballers
Uruguayan expatriate footballers
Association football defenders
Defensor Sporting players
Polideportivo Ejido footballers
CD Badajoz players
CF Badalona players
El Tanque Sisley players
Expatriate footballers in Spain